A Spectrum of Finite Scale is a tour-only album by the band Man or Astro-man? A departure from the band's space-surf instrumentals, A Spectrum of Finite Scale is a compilation of experiments produced by members of the Man or Astro-Man? team.

Tracks were contributed by pairs of band members, individual members, and personnel including soundman The Brannock Device and  Q-Beam.

Track listing

 "After All the Prosaic Waiting...the Sun Finally Crashes into the Earth"
 "The Limitations of a Serial Machine"
 "MO2"
 "Halfway to the Infinite"
 "Space Helmet"
 "All the Quietest Whispers"
 "Mt-52 Tone/Magnus Opus" [sic]
 "Tolerance in a Transitory Universe"
 "Analysis Paralysis"
 "Man or Man-Machine?"
 "The Potential Energy of Roger Stone"
 "Mortimer Butomite's Pocket of Capacitors" 
 "Fig. A: Dispersion in Full Spectrum Pattern"
 "(untitled track number thirty-two)"

References

Man or Astro-man? albums
Spectrum Of Finite Scale, A